The British airborne forces, during the Second World War, consisted of the Parachute Regiment, the Glider Pilot Regiment, the airlanding battalions, and from 1944 the Special Air Service Troops.
Their formation followed the success of the German airborne operations, during the Battle of France. The British Prime Minister, Winston Churchill, directed the War Office to investigate the possibility of creating a corps of 5,000 parachute troops.

On 22 June 1940, No. 2 Commando was turned over to parachute duties and on 21 November, re-designated the 11th Special Air Service Battalion, with a parachute and glider wing. It was 38 men of this battalion who on 10 February 1941 took part in Operation Colossus the first British airborne operation. In September, the battalion was re-designated the 1st Parachute Battalion. A request for volunteers for parachute duties provided enough men to form the 2nd, 3rd and 4th Parachute Battalions. The volunteers for glider-borne infantry were formed into airlanding battalions from December 1941.

The success of early British airborne operations prompted the War Office to expand the existing airborne force, setting up the Airborne Forces Depot and Battle School in Derbyshire in April 1942, and creating the Parachute Regiment. The fledgling force received another boost following the German success in the Battle of Crete, when the War Office issued a communiqué. The Airborne Forces of the British Army consists of the parachute troops and glider-borne troops of all arms of service. Officers and men in any regiment or corps, may apply for transfer to a parachute or glider-borne unit of the Airborne Forces.

By the end of the war the British Army had raised seventeen parachute and eight airlanding battalions. These battalions served in seven parachute brigades, three airlanding brigades and three airborne divisions. Some British battalions served in the Far East with Indian Army formations. One Canadian parachute battalion served in a British parachute brigade and a Polish parachute brigade served with a British division.

Almost all the battalions played some part in British airborne operations. The first of which was a platoon sized operation in Italy. The second a company parachute landing in France. Building experience all the time these operations were followed by three battalion sized parachute landings in Tunisia. Parachute and airlanding brigades carried out landings in Sicily and the south of France. But the pinnacle of British airborne operations, were three divisional landings at Normandy, Arnhem and the River Rhine crossing in Germany.

The British airborne forces were easily identified by their distinctive uniform. The maroon beret, the airborne forces patch of Bellerophon riding the flying horse Pegasus and parachute wings worn on the right shoulder of trained parachutists. On operations, airborne forces wore their own pattern steel helmet instead of the standard British Brodie helmet and after 1942, the camouflaged Denison smock was issued to airborne forces.

Battalions

Notes
Footnotes

Citations

References

.
 01
.World War II
.Airborne
Airb
Airborne, World War II
British Airborne
.
Airborne battalions